Helü or Hellu was from 514 to 496 BC king of the state of Wu toward the end of the Spring and Autumn period of ancient China. His given name was Guang; he was initially known as Prince Guang.

Life

Prince Guang was the son of King Yumei, and the nephew of King Liao. He welcomed the Chu exile Wu Zixu into his entourage and, when he sought to usurp the throne of Wu, was introduced by him to Zhuan Zhu. Zhuan assassinated King Liao in 515BC and the prince became King Helü. The king assigned Wu Zixu to lead the design and building of his "great city," which forms the basis of Suzhou's present old town.

In 506 BC, Helü with the help of Wu Zixu and Sun Tzu, the author of The Art of War, launched major offensives against the state of Chu. They prevailed in five battles, one of which was the Battle of Boju, and conquered the capital Ying. During the sack of the capital, Helü attempted to sexually assault the Dowager Queen, but she fought him off with a knife and remonstrated with him, leading to Helü leaving in shame. Chu managed to ask the state of Qin for help, and after he was defeated by Qin, the vanguard general of Wu troops, Fugai, a younger brother of Helü, led a rebellion. After beating Fugai, Helü was forced to leave Chu. Fugai later retired to Chu and settled there.

In 496 BC, upon hearing that Yunchang of Yue had died, he launched an invasion of Yue, but was injured and subsequently died from his injuries while telling his son to avenge him. His son, Fuchai, succeeded him in 495 BC who later annexed Yue and ended up capturing and enslaving their King Goujian. Helü had two other sons named Bo and Shan. Bo was initially his heir but died before him.

Literary sources
 Records of the Grand Historian
 Gailu text presenting the dialogue between Helü and Wu Zixu, one of the 8 texts from the Tomb 247 (202-186 BCE) excavated at Zhangjiashan, Jingzhou, Hubei, in 1983. The text is paralleled by a Dunhuang manuscript which attributes the conversation to Duke Jing of Qi and Yan Ying.

References

Zhou dynasty nobility
496 BC deaths
6th-century BC Chinese monarchs
5th-century BC Chinese monarchs
Year of birth unknown
Monarchs of Wu (state)